Tom Pittman (March 16, 1932 – October 31, 1958) was an American film and television actor. After his death at the age of 26, the Los Angeles Times called him "one of Hollywood's most promising young actors."

Career
Pittman was born Jerry Lee Alten in Phoenix, Arizona. His father was television and radio actor Frank Alten. Pittman began his career in acting in 1956 with a guest starring role on Science Fiction Theatre. He made his film debut that same year in D-Day the Sixth of June. Pittman went on to roles in numerous television Westerns including Gunsmoke (playing “Jimmy McQueen” a young affable yet smart herder who seeks revenge on a career horse-thief in the 1956 S1E32 entitled “Dutch George” and in 1957 as “Budge Grilk”, a psychotic step-son in S3E5’s “Potato Road”), Cheyenne, Have Gun – Will Travel,  The Restless Gun, and Cimarron City. He also appeared in the 1957 drama The Young Stranger (1957) and the musical comedy Bernardine (1957). His final two roles were in the films Verboten! and High School Big Shot, both released in 1959, the year following his death.

Death
On October 31, 1958, Pittman was driving home after a Halloween party when he ran his Porsche Spyder off the road at a sharp curve in the Hollywood Hills. After he failed to return home, his father filed a missing persons report. On November 19, Los Angeles police officer Roy Kerton retraced the roads Pittman's father said his son liked to drive and found the wreckage of Pittman's Porsche at the bottom of a 150-foot ravine. Pittman died after crashing through the guard rail, his car landing at the bottom of the ravine where it remained out of sight.

Filmography

References

External links

1932 births
1958 deaths
20th-century American male actors
American male film actors
American male television actors
Male actors from Phoenix, Arizona
Male Western (genre) film actors
Road incident deaths in California
Western (genre) television actors